Illya Shevtsov (born 13 April 2000) is a Ukrainian professional footballer who plays for Desna Chernihiv.

Club career

Krystal Kherson
Shevtsov started his professional career at age 15, playing in the Ukrainian Second League for Krystal Kherson. He made his league debut for the club on 8 August 2015 as a substitute against Real Pharma Odesa.

Shakhtar Donetsk
In December 2016, he signed with Shakhtar Donetsk, where he played mainly for the under-19 team.

Desna 2 Chernihiv
In 2019, Shevtsov signed with Desna-2 Chernihiv, the reserve team of Desna Chernihiv of the Ukrainian Premier League. On 13 March 2020, he scored five goals in a match against Lviv 2, on his way to becoming the top scorer of the 2019–20 Ukrainian Under-21 Championship.

Desna Chernihiv
In summer 2020, Shevtsov was on the first team of Desna Chernihiv, for their Europa League third qualifying round match against VfL Wolfsburg, appearing in the second half as a substitute.
On 24 October, he scored his first goal for Desna Chernihiv, in a 2–0 victory over Olimpik Donetsk.

On loan to Inhulets Petrove
In March 2021, he was loaned to Inhulets Petrove until the end of the 2020–21 season. He made his debut for that team on 7 March, against Kolos Kovalivka. On 3 April, he scored his first goal for Inhulets Petrove, converting a penalty kick against Mariupol.

Return to Desna Chernihiv
In summer 2021, Shevtsov returned to Desna Chernihiv. On 25 July, he made his 2021–22 season debut against Chornomorets Odesa, coming on as a substitute in the 81st minute. In 2022, following the Russian invasion of Ukraine, he terminated his contract with the club.

On loan to Charlotte Independence
In May 2022, he was loaned to Charlotte Independence in USL League One. On 5 June, he made his league debut against Greenville Triumph, replacing Grayson Barber in the 63rd minute. On 26 June, he scored his first goal for the club, in a match against Forward Madison. On 10 September 2022, he had the go-ahead score against Greenville for the 2-1 victory. In December 2022 his contract with the club was expired.

International career
In 2017, Shevtsov was on the Ukraine under-17 team, helping it qualify for the 2017 UEFA European Under-17 Championship in Croatia. He played seven games and scored a goal.

He was included in the Ukraine under-21 team for the 2021 UEFA European Under-21 Championship qualification competition, which made him the first player from Desna Chernihiv to be included in a Ukraine under-21 side. On 9 October 2020, he made his debut in Ukraine under-21 against Romania, replacing Danylo Sikan in the 66th minute.

On 13 November 2020, he scored his first goal for the Ukraine under-21s in a 4–1 away victory over Malta, in a 2021 UEFA European Under-21 Championship qualifier.

Personal life
He is the son of Ukrainian former footballer and coach Serhiy Shevtsov.

Career statistics

Club

Honours
Individual
 Top Scorer of Ukrainian Premier League Reserves: 2019–20 (13 goals)

Notes

References

External links 
 Profile on Official website of Charlotte Independence 
 Profile on Official website of FC Desna Chernihiv 
 
 
 

Living people
2000 births
Association football midfielders
Ukrainian footballers
Ukraine youth international footballers
Ukraine under-21 international footballers
FC Krystal Kherson players
FC Desna Chernihiv players
FC Desna-2 Chernihiv players
FC Inhulets Petrove players
Charlotte Independence players
Ukrainian Premier League players
Ukrainian Second League players
USL League One players
Ukrainian expatriate footballers
Expatriate soccer players in the United States
Ukrainian expatriate sportspeople in the United States